Dennis Wayne Harrah (born March 9, 1953) is a former offensive lineman who played 13 seasons in the National Football League (NFL) for the Los Angeles Rams. He played college football for the University of Miami. He played for and graduated from Stonewall Jackson High School in Charleston, West Virginia - now Stonewall Jackson Middle School.

University of Miami 
Harrah was a 1974 All-America selection by NEA and TSN, Time magazine as a tackle. He was a Second-team  All-America pick by UPI and AP. Was a 6-5 259 senior who could run a 4.8 40-yard dash and bench press 500 pounds. He is a member of the University of Miami Sports Hall of Fame.

Los Angeles Rams 
Harrah was selected eleventh overall by the Los Angeles Rams in the 1975 NFL Draft. He helped the Rams win the NFC West six times (1975–79 and 1985) and the 1979 NFC Championship Game.  During his tenure with the team, the Rams led the NFC in Points Scored in 1976, Total Yards Gained in 1980, and Yards Rushing in 1976 and 1980. He served as team captain for six years and played in the Pro Bowl six times.

As a rookie in 1975, Harrah backed up starter Joe Scibelli and played on special teams. In 1976, he took over at right guard and held that position for 12 seasons. He was nicknamed "Herk" by his teammates, short for Hercules. Harrah was one of the players who appeared in the 1986 Rams promotional video, Let's Ram It, introducing himself with the rapped line "I'm a mountain man from West VA."

References

1953 births
Living people
American football offensive guards
Los Angeles Rams players
National Conference Pro Bowl players
Miami Hurricanes football players